Francis Robert Latchford, QC (April 30, 1856 – August 13, 1938) was an Ontario lawyer, judge and political figure. He represented Renfrew South in the Legislative Assembly of Ontario from 1899 to 1904 as a Liberal member.

He was born in Aylmer, Quebec, the son of James Culhane Latchford, an Irish immigrant, and studied at the University of Ottawa. Latchford was called to the bar in 1886. He was named King's Counsel in 1899. Latchford served as Commissioner of Public Works from 1899 to 1904 and Attorney General of Ontario from 1904 to 1905. He was named a judge in the Supreme Court of Ontario in 1908 and served until his death. Latchford was also an amateur conchologist specializing in fresh water molluscs. He died in Toronto.

References 
 Biography excerpt from American Malacologists: A national register, Abbott, R.T., and M.E. Young  (1973)

External links
 

1856 births
1938 deaths
Attorneys General of Ontario
Judges in Ontario
Ontario Liberal Party MPPs
Politicians from Gatineau
Canadian King's Counsel